Daniel Ellensohn (born 9 August 1985 in Cape Town) is an association football striker from New Zealand who currently plays for Samoa based League side Kiwi FC. He has also been known to DJ, with popular London clubs Gigalum and Ministry of Sound hosting him.

Club career
His previous teams include Team Wellington and Waitakere United. Ellensohn holds dual citizenship with Austria and New Zealand.  The South African-born striker played from 2004 to 2008 in the New Zealand Football Championship, initially for three seasons at Waitakere United, with whom he twice reached the 2005 and 2007 Grand Final, but lost both went to Auckland City. In 2007, he moved to Wellington team again in 2008 and reached the Grand Final, this time against his former club Waitakere. In spite of his hits for the 1:0-lead his team lost the game even with 2:3.
Ellensohn then became the first ever New Zealander to sign in Austria as he signed for FC Lustenau in the Erste Liga, where his contract was no longer extended due to injury. For the 2008/09 season Ellensohn returned to Waitakere and participated with the team at the FIFA Club World Cup 2008 (however, came at the 1:2 defeat against Adelaide United). Ellensohn has also spent a season with Sydney's Macarthur Rams in the NSW State League.
In 2011-12 he signed with Kiwi FC, in London, UK.

International career
Ellensohn has made a solitary appearance for the New Zealand All Whites as a substitute in the 2010 FIFA World Cup qualifier against Vanuatu on 17 November 2007. He was included in the New Zealand squad for the football tournament at the Summer Olympics in Beijing, where they competed against hosts China, Brazil and Belgium. Ellensohn scored the only goal in New Zealand U-23 historic 1–0 win over Chile, in Wellington, New Zealand on 4 July 2008, which tied the series 1-1.
http://www.kiwifc.com/#/squad/4554518247

He has represented New Zealand's national beach soccer team, where he was named captain during the OFC Beach World Cup Qualifiers.

Personal 
His brother David Ellensohn has represented New Zealand at Secondary School level as a goalkeeper and the South African born New Zealander holds an Austrian passport.

References

External links

Daniel Ellensohn player profile at the official Team Wellington website 
Daniel Ellensohn player profile at the official Kiwi FC website 
Daniel Ellensohn player Stats at the official Kiwi FC website 

1985 births
Living people
Sportspeople from Cape Town
New Zealand association footballers
New Zealand international footballers
Olympic association footballers of New Zealand
Association football forwards
Waitakere United players
Team Wellington players
FC Lustenau players
Expatriate footballers in Austria
New Zealand expatriate sportspeople in Austria
New Zealand people of Austrian descent
South African emigrants to New Zealand
2008 OFC Nations Cup players
Footballers at the 2008 Summer Olympics